Historian is the second studio album by American singer-songwriter Lucy Dacus, released on March 2, 2018, through Matador Records.

Background
Historian was produced by Dacus, Jacob Blizard and Collin Pastore, the same team that produced her debut album, No Burden. Dacus and her band recorded the album over the course of a week in March 2017 in Nashville. She described the album as a song cycle about "living through loss and the inevitable darkness of life, and doing so hopefully and joyfully." Of the title of the album, Dacus explained, "It's me having this impulse to document and capture and create a history of my life and the people that I know ... Because as I'm making this history and capturing these things that I hold dear, those things won't stay."

On December 12, 2017, Dacus formally announced the album, alongside the first single from the album "Night Shift". The second single "Addictions" was released on January 16, 2018.

Critical reception

Historian was met with "universal acclaim" reviews from critics. At Metacritic, which assigns a weighted average rating out of 100 to reviews from mainstream publications, this release received an average score of 82  based on 20 reviews. Marcy Donelson of AllMusic said of the release: "Ultimately, the forte passages don't encroach on the songwriting, as they underline emotion, but they do, at times, step on Dacus' voice, when she's clouded by high-volume accompaniment or even vocal processing. Thankfully, those moments are brief and rare, allowing her lyrics and expressive sense of melody to shine."

Accolades

Track listing

Personnel

Musicians
 Lucy Dacus – primary artist, vocals, producer
 Jake Finch – drums
 Miles Huffman – drums
 John Hulley – trombone
 Reggie Pace – trombone
 Sam Koff – trumpet
 Steve Cunningham – trumpet
 Ben Plotnick – viola
 John Mailander – violin

Production
 Jacob Blizard – producer
 Collin Pastore – engineer, producer
 Heba Kadry – mastering
 Scottie Prudhoe – engineer
 John Congleton – mixing
 Preston Cochran – engineer
 Adrian Olsen – engineer

Charts

References

2018 albums
Lucy Dacus albums
Matador Records albums
Alternative country albums by American artists
Rock-and-roll albums